Hammurabi may refer to:

Kings

Hammurabi, the sixth king of the First Babylonian Dynasty
 Code of Hammurabi, famous code of law drafted by Hammurabi
Hammurabi I, the third king of Yamhad, a contemporary to Hammurabi of Babylon
Hammurabi II, a king of Yamhad
Hammurabi III, a king of Yamhad

In computers
 Hamurabi (video game), one of the earliest computer games

Other uses
 A division of the Iraqi Republican Guard during the Saddam Hussein era
 7207 Hammurabi, an asteroid in the Solar System Asteroid belt